HMS Caledon was a  light cruiser built for the Royal Navy during World War I. She was the name ship of the Caledon sub-class of the C class. She survived both world wars to be scrapped in 1948.

Design and description
The Caledon sub-class was a slightly larger and improved version of the preceding Centaur sub-class with a more powerful armament. She carried  tons of fuel oil. The ship had a crew of about 400 officers and ratings; this increased to 437 when serving as a flagship.

The main armament of the Caledon-class ships consisted of five BL 6-inch (152 mm) Mk XII guns that were mounted on the centreline. One gun was forward of the bridge, two were fore and aft of the two funnels and the last two were in the stern, with one gun superfiring over the rearmost gun. The two QF  20-cwt anti-aircraft guns were positioned abreast of the fore funnel. The torpedo armament of the Caledons was four times more powerful than that of the Centaurs, with eight  torpedo tubes in four twin mounts, two on each broadside.

Caledon was converted at the end of 1943 to an anti-aircraft cruiser, replacing the entire former armament with three QF  Mk XVI twin and two Bofors  Mk IV "Hazemeyer" twin mounts. By 1944 this was supplemented by six Bofors 40 mm Mk III and one Oerlikon  Mk III single mounts.

Construction and career
She was laid down by Cammell Laird on 17 March 1916, launched on 25 November 1916 and commissioned into the Navy on 6 March 1917. Caledon, commanded by Commodore Walter Cowan, saw action in the Second Battle of Heligoland Bight, where the ship was the leader of the First Light Cruiser Squadron. During the battle, British light cruisers, including Caledon, supported by the First Battlecruiser Squadron, attempted to cut off and destroy a force of German minesweepers escorted by light cruisers. The engagement developed into a chase with the German ships retreating behind smoke screens. Caledon was hit by a single  shell from one of the German battleships which failed to explode, and did no damage. Throughout the battle, five men of Caledons crew were killed, with one man, John Henry Carless being awarded a posthumous Victoria Cross for remaining at his gun after receiving a fatal wound. Caledon survived the First World War.

Caledon shelled Soviet forces at Ventspils during February, helping Latvians to retake the town, before being returning to the United Kingdom later that month, with British naval forces in the Baltic being relieved every six weeks. Caledon returned again in July.

She was reassigned to the Eastern Fleet between August 1940 and September 1942. Caledon then rejoined the Home Fleet. Upon her arrival in the UK, she underwent conversion into an anti-aircraft cruiser at Chatham Dockyard between 14 September 1942 and 7 December 1943, replacing the entire armament with modern AA weaponry. Obsolete by the end of the war, she was disarmed in April 1945, and subsequently sold for scrap on 22 January 1948. Caledon arrived at the yards of Dover Industries, Dover, on 14 February 1948 to be broken up.

Notes

Footnotes

Bibliography

External links
 HMS Caledon at Uboat.net

 

C-class cruisers
Ships built on the River Mersey
1916 ships
World War I cruisers of the United Kingdom
World War II cruisers of the United Kingdom